Lukáš Čmelík (born 13 April 1996) is a Slovak professional footballer who plays as a forward for České Budějovice on loan from Karviná.

Club career
He made his debut for Žilina on 17 November 2012 in a league match against Ružomberok, coming on as a '80 minute substitute for Milan Škriniar, in a 0-1 away loss.

After loans in Switzerland and Poland he had settled in DAC Dunajská Streda. Overall, he made 38 league appearances for the club, scoring a single goal against iClinic Sereď, during a 5:0 away victory in April 2019, following a pass by Kristopher Vida. He also scored three goals in six Slovnaft Cup games, but all were against lower division clubs. He also represented DAC in 4 Europa League qualifiers against Cracovia and Asteras Tripolis.

References

External links
 
 Futbalnet profile
 

1996 births
Living people
Sportspeople from Žilina
Slovak footballers
Slovakia youth international footballers
Slovakia under-21 international footballers
Association football forwards
MŠK Žilina players
FC Sion players
Piast Gliwice players
FC DAC 1904 Dunajská Streda players
MFK Karviná players
Slovak Super Liga players
Ekstraklasa players
Czech First League players
Slovak expatriate sportspeople in Switzerland
Slovak expatriate sportspeople in Poland
Slovak expatriate sportspeople in the Czech Republic
Expatriate footballers in Switzerland
Expatriate footballers in Poland
Expatriate footballers in the Czech Republic
SK Dynamo České Budějovice players